Nosrati-ye Sar Anbar (also Romanized as Noşratī-ye Sar Anbār; also known as Noşratī-ye Sar Anbār-e Kalāntarī) is a village in Teshkan Rural District, Chegeni District, Dowreh County, Lorestan Province, Iran. At the 2006 census, its population was 310, in 64 families.

References 

Towns and villages in Dowreh County